Muramvya Province is one of the 18 provinces of Burundi. The capital city is Muramvya. In 2007 the province was added to the UNESCO World Heritage Tentative List.

Culture 
The area is renowned for the route of enthronement of the Bami (kings), the royal capital of Mbuye, the necropolis of the queen mothers in Mpotsa, and the royal necropolis of Nkiko-Mugamba, amongst other things.

World Heritage status 
The region's cultural and natural landscape was added to the UNESCO World Heritage Tentative List on May 9, 2007 in the Mixed (Cultural & Natural) category.

Communes
Muramvya Province is divided administratively into the following communes:

 Commune of Bukeye
 Commune of Kiganda
 Commune of Mbuye
 Commune of Muramvya
 Commune of Rutegama

Notes

References 
Les paysages naturels sacrés de Muramvya, de Mpotsa et de Nkiko-Mugamba - UNESCO World Heritage Centre Accessed 2009-02-25.

 
Provinces of Burundi